Jaki Liebezeit (born Hans Liebezeit; 26 May 1938  – 22 January 2017) was a German drummer, best known as a founding member of experimental rock band Can.  He was called "one of the few drummers to convincingly meld the funky and the cerebral".

Early life
Hans "Jaki" Liebezeit was born in the village of Ostrau near Dresden, Germany. His mother Elisabeth was from Lower Saxony. His father, Karl Moritz Johannes Liebezeit, was the music teacher at the village school, specialising in accordion and violin, and taught both instruments to Jaki, who treasured his father's accordion for the rest of his life. His father was forced to stop teaching music during the Nazi period, and died in mysterious circumstances on 18 August 1943.

His early life was one of extreme poverty, with no running water at home, surviving on vegetables grown in the garden, and having to walk several kilometres to school daily. As the Russians began to occupy East Germany, he became a refugee when his mother took him west to Hannoversch Münden to live with her mother and brother, just before the border closed in 1945.

Musical career

In the mid-1960s, he was part of Manfred Schoof's quintet, who were early exponents of European free jazz.

He subsequently moved towards the new possibilities being opened by psychedelic music as a member of Can. His drumming was prominent in the band's sound, particularly in his much-admired contribution to the side-long "Halleluhwah" on Tago Mago. Liebezeit is best known for his exceptional "metronome" style of playing; other members of Can have suggested that he sounds as though he is "half-man, half machine".

Liebezeit provided drums, in the form of the distinctive "Motorik beat", for Michael Rother's late-1970s solo albums.

In 1980, he became a member of Phantomband, and formed drum ensembles such as Drums off Chaos and Club off Chaos. Later he recorded with numerous musicians, such as Jah Wobble and Philip Jeck, with whom he produced an album for Jah Wobble's 30 Hertz Records, and contributed drums and percussion to many albums as a guest musician over the years, such as the Depeche Mode album Ultra and Brian Eno's album Before and After Science. In later years, he worked with Burnt Friedman on the Secret Rhythms albums and with Schiller on the Atemlos album.

He also worked on the Cyclopean EP, released on 11 February 2013 on 12" and download for Mute Records. Cyclopean was a project that involved, other than Liebezeit, Irmin Schmidt from Can alongside long time collaborators Jono Podmore (Kumo / Metamono) and musician and producer Burnt Friedman. He recorded with Hans Joachim Irmler of Faust an album called Flut released 18 July 2014.

In 2013 he recorded the album The Obscure Department with British singer-songwriter Robert Coyne. Two more albums with Coyne, Golden Arc (2014) and I Still Have This Dream (2016), followed.

Liebezeit died of pneumonia on 22 January 2017.

A tribute concert to Liebezeit, at the Philharmonic Hall, Cologne took place on 22 January 2018.

Videography
Romantic Warriors IV: Krautrock (2019)

References

1938 births
2017 deaths
Avant-garde jazz drummers
German rock drummers
Male drummers
German male musicians
Can (band) members
Musicians from Dresden
German jazz drummers
20th-century German musicians
21st-century German musicians
Progressive rock drummers
German male jazz musicians
Deaths from pneumonia in Germany
Globe Unity Orchestra members
German anarchists